The Victoria line is a London Underground line that runs between  in south London and  in the north-east, via the West End. It is printed in light blue on the Tube map and is one of the only two lines on the network to run completely underground, the other being the Waterloo & City line.

The line was constructed in the 1960s and was the first entirely new Underground line in London for 50 years. It was designed to reduce congestion on other lines, particularly the Piccadilly line and the  branch of the Northern line. The line was completed to Victoria station in March 1969 and was opened by Queen Elizabeth II who rode a train from Green Park to Victoria. The southern extension to Brixton opened in 1971, and Pimlico station was added in 1972.

The Victoria line is operated using automatic train operation, but all trains have drivers. The 2009 Tube Stock replaced the original 1967 Tube Stock trains. The line serves 16 stations and all but Pimlico provide interchanges with other Transport for London or National Rail services. The line, the most intensively used on the Underground, is used by over 200 million passengers each year, making it the sixth-busiest tube line.

History

Planning
The first proposal for a railway in this area appeared in the County of London Plan, published in 1943. In 1948, a working party set up by the British Transport Commission (BTC) proposed a tube railway from Victoria to Walthamstow, largely based on a 1946 plan for a Croydon-to-Finsbury Park line. Its main purpose was to relieve congestion in the central area, which had been a problem since the 1930s.

In early 1949, the BTC committee looked at the feasibility of building a deep-level tube to fulfil these requirements. For the first time, cost–benefit analysis was used to ensure the line would be built within budget and be profitable. The Private bill was introduced in Parliament in 1955. It described a line from Victoria to Walthamstow next to the British Rail station. Another proposal not in the Bill, supported an extension from Victoria to Fulham Broadway on the District line terminating at Edmonton instead of Walthamstow. Proposals were made to extend the line north to South Woodford or Woodford to provide interchange with the Central line. In 1961, it was decided to terminate the line at Walthamstow (Hoe Street) station, which was renamed  on 6 May 1968 in anticipation of the line's opening.

The name "Victoria line" dates from 1955; other suggestions were "Walvic line" (Walthamstow–Victoria), "Viking line" (Victoria–King's Cross), "Mayfair line" and "West End line". During the planning stages, it was known as Route C and named the Victoria line (after the station) by David McKenna, Chairman of British Transport Advertising, whose suggestion was seconded by Sir John Elliot. The board decided that the Victoria line sounded "just right".

Walthamstow–Victoria
Initial construction began in January 1960, when two test tunnels were started from Tottenham to Manor House under Seven Sisters Road. The work was completed in July 1961, with the expectation it would be used for the completed Victoria line.

After the line gained parliamentary approval on 20 August 1962 with a budget of £56 million, construction began the following month. The economic boom of the mid-to-late 1950s had faded leading to a rise in unemployment in London, and the government had hoped that building the Victoria line would alleviate this. Work began adapting Oxford Circus station to link to the new line; a cross-platform interchange was provided with the Bakerloo line and a subway link with the Central line. A steel umbrella was erected over the junction in August 1963 so that a new ticket hall could be built without disrupting existing traffic. Rolling stock on the line was fitted with Automatic Train Operation (ATO), which allowed self-driving of the train based on automatic electrical signals along the track. In March 1964, a £2.25 million contract was awarded to Metro-Cammell for the Victoria line fleet.

All major contracts had been awarded by 1965, and construction was on track to be completed in 1968. The station at Blackhorse Road was built on the opposite side of the road from the mainline station (serving the Kentish Town to Barking line) and was not an interchange.

There was no opening ceremony; instead the normal timetable started. The first train left Walthamstow Central for Highbury & Islington at 7:32 a.m. The line proved to meet a need; more than 1,000 tickets were purchased at Highbury & Islington within its first hour of opening.

The next section to Warren Street, opened on 1 December 1968, again without ceremony. The line was formally opened by Queen Elizabeth II on 7 March 1969 when it had been completed to Victoria. At 11:00 a.m., the Queen made the first trip, on a 5d (2.08p) ticket, from Green Park to Victoria, where she unveiled a plaque. In so doing, she was the first reigning monarch to ride on the Underground. The line was open to the general public by 3:00 p.m. Trains from Walthamstow to Victoria took around 24 minutes.

Victoria–Brixton

Preparatory work had started at Bessborough Gardens near Vauxhall Bridge Road in May 1967. The contract was awarded on 4 August 1967. A proposal to build Pimlico tube station received Government approval on 28 June 1968. In July, the Duke of Edinburgh and the Prince of Wales visited tunnel workings under Vauxhall Park.

The Brixton extension was bored using the older Greathead shield. Although slower, use of the tunnelling shield allowed easier digging through the gravel strata south of the Thames. On opening, it was the first new section of Underground to open south of the Thames since the extension of the City and South London Railway from Clapham Common to Morden in 1926. The final piece of the Victoria line, Pimlico station, opened on 14 September 1972.

London Transport considered extensions to Streatham, Dulwich and Crystal Palace to provide a connection to southeast London and Kent but no construction work was undertaken.

Post-opening
The Kentish Town to Barking line did not close as expected and both stations at Blackhorse Road remained open. The mainline station was moved to the same side of the road as the tube station and was connected to the Victoria line on 14 December 1981 via an overbridge. The original station was then closed and demolished.

The London Underground (Victoria) Act 1991 allowed for the construction of a  underground pedestrian link at Victoria station between the Victoria line platforms and the sub-surface Circle line platforms above. The London Underground (Victoria Station Upgrade) Order 2009 came into force in September that year, authorising the construction of a second  ticket hall at Victoria.

Warren Street tube station was attacked in the 2005 London bombings. There were no fatalities in this attack. After the 2005 London bombings, there was heightened security. The London Police wrongly detained and shot 27-year-old Jean Charles de Menezes once he boarded a train at one of the stations on the Victoria line. Jean did not survive. After he died a memorial was placed at the station.

On 23 January 2014, during upgrade work at Victoria, construction workers accidentally penetrated the signalling room of the Victoria line and flooded it with quick-drying concrete, leading to the suspension of services south of Warren Street. Services resumed the following day after sugar was used to slow the setting of the concrete and make it easier to shovel out.

A 24-hour Night Tube service on Friday and Saturday nights, due to start in September 2015 on the entire line, was delayed because of strike action. The service began in August 2016, with trains running at 10-minute intervals on the whole line.

Design
Every Victoria line station, apart from Pimlico and Blackhorse Road,  was built as an interchange and several stations were rearranged to allow for cross-platform interchange with the line. In some stations, the Victoria line platforms were built on either side of the existing arrangement; in others, the Victoria line uses the older platforms and the existing line was diverted onto a new alignment. The line has hump-backed stations to allow trains to store gravitational potential energy as they slow down and release it when they leave a station, providing an energy saving of 5% and allowing trains to run 9% faster.

The stations were originally tiled in blue and grey, each decorated with tiled motifs in seating recesses for identification. Some motifs were puns; the image for Brixton, for instance, was a ton of bricks. During construction of the first stage of the Jubilee line in 1979, the motifs on Green Park station were replaced by others matching the design for the Jubilee line platforms.

In late 2010 and 2011, platform humps were installed on all Victoria line stations except Pimlico to provide step-free access to trains. The project was in accordance with the Rail Vehicle Accessibility (Non Interoperable Rail System) Regulations 2010 and the Disability Discrimination Act 1995. The Victoria line humps resemble the Harrington Hump, a type of ramp being installed on some mainline stations, but are of a masonry construction.

Service and rolling stock

About 200 million passengers a year use the Victoria line. It is the sixth-most heavily used line on the network in absolute figures, but in terms of the average number of journeys per mile it is by far the most intensively used. From May 2017, trains run every 100 seconds during peak periods, providing 36 trains per hour. All trains run from Brixton to Seven Sisters and some continue to Walthamstow Central.

When the line opened, services were operated by a fleet of  eight-car trains of 1967 Tube Stock trains. In the early planning stages, an articulated type of rolling stock was considered, but not progressed because of difficulties transferring the stock to Acton Works for heavy overhauls. After Acton Works closed, this no longer applies. The 2009 tube stock has a wider profile and slightly longer carriages which precludes it from running on other deep-level tube lines. The 1967 stock was supplemented by 1972 Mark I Tube Stock, transferred from the Northern line and converted to be compatible with the 1967 stock.

Replacement of the 1967 rolling stock began in July 2009. The 2009 Tube Stock fleet of 47 eight-car trains, was built by Bombardier Transportation. Testing the first prototypes began in 2008. The trains began to be introduced in 2009 and most were in operation by the following year. The last of the 1967 stock trains ran on 30 June 2011, after which the entire service was provided by 2009 stock.

On opening, the line was equipped with a fixed-block Automatic Train Operation system (ATO). The train operator closed the train doors and pressed a pair of "start" buttons and, if the way ahead was clear, the ATO drives the train at a safe speed to the next station. At any point, the driver could switch to manual control if the ATO failed. The system, which operated until 2012, made the Victoria line the world's first full-scale automatic railway.

The Victoria line runs faster trains than other Underground lines because it has fewer stops, ATO running and modern design. A common method used by north London residents to visit the West End is to take the Northern line Bank branch, change platforms at Euston, and continue on faster Victoria line trains. The original signalling has been replaced with a more modern ATO system from Westinghouse Rail Systems incorporating 'Distance to Go Radio' and more than 400 track circuits. The track operator, London Underground Limited, claimed it is the world's first ATO-on-ATO upgrade. The new system allowed a revised timetable to be introduced in February 2013, allowing up to 33 trains per hour instead of 27. In combination with new, faster trains, the line's capacity increased by 21%, equivalent to an extra 10,000 passengers per hour.

Facilities

Step-free access 

When the line was built, budgetary restrictions meant that station infrastructure standards were lower than on older lines and on later extension projects. Examples include narrower than usual platforms and undecorated ceilings at Walthamstow Central, Blackhorse Road and Tottenham Hale, affecting lighting levels. The line was built with fewer escalators than other lines as a cost-saving measure. The lack of a third escalator linking station entrances to platforms at some stations can cause severe congestion at peak times. Stations have closed temporarily for safety reasons when escalators have been unserviceable.

Step-free routes are available between the Victoria line and other lines at most interchanges. Tottenham Hale, Finsbury Park, King's Cross St Pancras, Green Park, Victoria, Vauxhall and Brixton have step-free access from street to train. Platform humps have been installed at all stations (except Pimlico) to provide level access to trains, improving access for customers with mobility impairments, luggage or pushchairs.

Ventilation

About 50 ventilation shafts were constructed during the construction phase. Midpoint tunnel ventilation shafts remain between stations. Special "local arrangements" are in place should it be necessary to evacuate passengers from trains via Netherton Road emergency escape shaft. Planning permission for a shaft at Ferry Lane, next to Tottenham Hale station, was granted on 11 January 1968, during the first phase of construction.

By mid-2009, trial boreholes for a cooling system at Green Park station had been drilled and more were scheduled to be created by the end of 2009. In 2010, Engineering & Technology reported that  of water per second for the cooling system was being pumped through heat-exchangers at Victoria station from the River Tyburn and into the River Thames.

Between 2009 and 2014, thirteen ventilation shafts were refurbished. In the first phase were Drayton Park, Gillingham Street, Moreton Terrace, Pulross Road, Somerleyton Road and Tynemouth Road. For the second phase were Cobourg Street, Dover Street, Gibson Square, Great Titchfield Street, Isledon Road, Kings Cross, Palace Street and Rita Road.

By 2009, changes at Cobourg Street were in the planning stage and demolition at Moreton Terrace, Somerleyton Road and Drayton Park shafts had taken place. Planning permission for Netherton Road shaft was granted on 8 September 1967. On 31 March, the demolition and rebuilding of Netherton Road shaft was allowed as permitted development.

Depot
The depot at Northumberland Park, the service and storage area for trains, is the only part of the Victoria line above ground. Trains access the depot via a branch line in a tunnel to the north of Seven Sisters.

The depot opened with the first stage of the line in September 1968. It is next to Northumberland Park railway station, on Tottenham Marshes in the London Borough of Haringey, over a mile from the Victoria line. As part of Transport for London's tube upgrade scheme, the depot has been expanded and upgraded to accommodate all the 2009 Tube Stock trains.

Future
Tottenham Hotspur F.C. and its supporters have campaigned for a surface station next to Northumberland Park Station, adjacent to the depot to improve the stadium's transport links, which are essential for the club to redevelop its ground and increase capacity. The plans require co-operation with the local council and Network Rail to minimise disruption. It was announced by Haringey Council in its 2012 A Plan for Tottenham report that there was "potential for a Victoria Line extension to Northumberland Park".

Crossrail 2, also known as the Chelsea-Hackney line, is a planned line across central London between Victoria and King's Cross St Pancras tube station to increase capacity in Central London by 270,000 passengers per day. It is intended to relieve congestion on the Victoria line, a key line connecting several important London termini.

The latter station would be on a large reversing loop with a single platform removing a critical capacity restriction eliminating the need for trains to reverse at Brixton and provide a more obvious route for passengers who look for the nearest tube station before any other transport options.

Stations

See also

List of crossings of the River Thames
Tunnels underneath the River Thames

Notes and references

Notes

References

Citations

Sources

External links

 
 London Transport Museum Poster Archive – images of the station tiling motifs:

London Underground lines
Railway lines opened in 1968
Transport in the London Borough of Lambeth
Transport in the City of Westminster
Transport in the London Borough of Camden
Transport in the London Borough of Islington
Transport in the London Borough of Haringey
Transport in the London Borough of Waltham Forest
Tunnels underneath the River Thames
Automatic London Underground lines
Standard gauge railways in London